Dianne Doan (born September 8, 1990) is a Canadian actress. She is known for portraying Lonnie in the Disney Channel Original Movies Descendants and Descendants 2.

Early life 
Doan was born and raised in Abbotsford, British Columbia.

She first developed an interest in acting in grade 9 when she took drama classes as an elective. She started technical training in dance at the age of 10.

Career 
As a young adult, she later performed as a dancer in the Opening Ceremonies for the 2010 Winter Olympics in Vancouver and as a back-up dancer for Michael Bublé. In addition, she's worked as a dancer to other music videos for recording artists including Big Time Rush and Marianas Trench as well as worked on Fox's So You Think You Can Dance.

While she's made small appearances on shows like ABC's Once Upon a Time and TV Land's Impastor, her big break came when she was cast in the Disney Channel made-for-television film Descendants as Lonnie, the daughter of Mulan and Li Shang. Disney's Descendants expanded into a successful franchise including prequel live-action mini series (which aired before the initial film), a sequel and an animated spin-off.

In 2016, she was cast in a major recurring role in History Channel's Vikings as Yidu for season four. Following that, she starred in a major role Verizon (go90) and AwesomenessTV's webseries Guidance where she played twin sisters.

In 2017, she joined the main cast of Cinemax's Warrior as the character of Mai Ling as a Series Regular. The series is produced by filmmaker Justin Lin, based on an original concept by the late Bruce Lee.

Personal life 
In 2019 she became engaged to actor Manny Jacinto.

Filmography

References

External links 
 
 Dianne Doan on Twitter

1990 births
Living people
Actresses from British Columbia
Canadian actresses of Vietnamese descent
Canadian actresses of Chinese descent
Canadian female dancers
People from Abbotsford, British Columbia